The Alfalfa Club, founded in 1913, is an exclusive social organization, based in Washington, D.C., in the United States. The Club's only function is the holding of an annual banquet in honor of the birthday of Civil War Confederate General Robert E. Lee. Its members are composed mostly of American politicians and influential members of the business community, and have included several Presidents of the United States.

Members (incomplete)

Presidents 

 George W. Bush
 George H. W. Bush
 Ronald Reagan
 Gerald Ford
 Richard Nixon
 John F. Kennedy
 Harry S. Truman
 Joseph Biden Jr.

Vice Presidents 

 Dick Cheney
 Dan Quayle
 Walter Mondale
 Nelson Rockefeller
 Spiro Agnew

Secretaries of State 

 Mike Pompeo
 John Kerry
 Condoleezza Rice
 Colin Powell
 Madeleine Albright
 James Baker III
 George P. Shultz
 Henry Kissinger
 John Foster Dulles
 Dean Acheson

Secretaries of Defense 

 Jim Mattis (current vice president of the club)
 Robert Gates
 Donald Rumsfeld
 Neil McElroy
 James R. Schlesinger

Other Cabinet Officials 

 Robert Mosbacher
 Donna Shalala

Members of Congress 

 Lamar Alexander
 Kelly Ayotte
 Robert F. Bennett
 Cory Booker
 David Boren
 Prescott Bush
 Shelley Moore Capito
 Christopher A. Coons
 Tom Daschle
 Debbie Dingell
 Elizabeth Dole
 David Dreier
 Joni Ernst
 Dianne Feinstein
 Newt Gingrich
 Barry Goldwater
 Barry Goldwater, Jr.
 Orrin Hatch
 Tim Kaine
 Jack Kemp
 William Knowland
 Joe Lieberman
 John McCain
 Kevin McCarthy
 Claire McCaskill
 Mitch McConnell
 Daniel Patrick Moynihan
 Ben Nelson
 Rob Portman
 Chuck Robb
 Jay Rockefeller
 Mitt Romney
 Chuck Schumer
 Mark Warner

Governors 

 Jeb Bush

Mayors 

 Michael Bloomberg

Supreme Court Justices 

 Stephen Breyer
 Ruth Bader Ginsburg
 William Rehnquist
 Sandra Day O'Connor
 Earl Warren
 John Roberts
 Anthony Kennedy

Judges 

 William T. Coleman, Jr.

Ambassadors 

 David M. Abshire
 Richard Helms

Military Officials 

 Neil Armstrong
 James Holloway III
 David Charles Jones
 Curtis LeMay
 David Petraeus
 William Westmoreland

FBI Directors 

 William S. Sessions

Federal Reserve Chairmen 

 Alan Greenspan

Business people 

 Brendan Bechtel, Bechtel CEO
 Jeff Bezos, Amazon founder
 Warren Buffett, Berkshire Hathaway CEO
 Steve Case, AOL founder
 Timothy C. Collins, finance
 Michael Dell, Dell founder
 Raul Fernandez, Proxicom founder
 Steve Forbes, Forbes editor-in-chief
 Bill Gates, Microsoft founder
 Katharine Graham, Washington Post publisher
 William Grayson, finance
 Marillyn Hewson, Lockheed CEO
 Walter Isaacson, Aspen Institute CEO, author
 Jay L. Johnson, former Navy CNO and General Dynamics CEO
 William B. Harrison Jr., JPMorgan Chase CEO
 Bill Marriott, Marriott International CEO
 Bill McSweeny, Occidental Petroleum President
 Robert Mondavi, winemaker
 Ross Perot, Electronic Data Systems founder 
Russ Ramsey, founder 
 Catherine Reynolds, student loans, philanthropist
 David Rubenstein, finance
 Donald Thompson, McDonald's CEO
 C. Bowdoin Train, finance
 Jamie Dimon, CEO JPMorgan Chase and Co.

Other 

 James A. Baker IV, lawyer
 Clark Clifford, lawyer
 Valerie Jarrett
 Vernon Jordan Jr., lawyer
 Arnold Palmer, golfer
 Landon Parvin, writer
 Richard Pearson

References

Alfalfa Club members, List of